The demographics of Somalis encompass the demographic features of Somalia's inhabitants, including ethnicity, language, population density, education level, health, economic status, religious affiliations and other aspects of the population. Somalia is believed to be one of the most homogeneous countries in sub-Saharan Africa.

2020 survey
Child marriages, known to deprive women of opportunities to reach their full potential, have among women aged 20-24, 36 percent of total population.

The April 2020 SHDS report further unveils that fertility rates remain very high, the total fertility rate for Somalia is 6.9 children per woman, the highest in the world, which would impact planning for the next years. In addition, 99 percent of women have still been genitally circumcised.

Ethnic groups
According to The Economist, at independence Somalia was "arguably in ethnic terms the most homogeneous country in sub-Saharan Africa", ahead of Botswana, which is four-fifths Tswana. However, the publication also notes that "its ethnic homogeneity is misleading. Despite also sharing a single language and religion, it is divided into more than 500 clans and sub-clans".

Somalis

Somalis constitute the largest ethnic group in Somalia, at approximately 85% of the nation's inhabitants. They are organized into clan groupings, which are important social units; clan membership plays a central part in Somali culture and politics. Clans are patrilineal and are typically divided into sub-clans, sometimes with many sub-divisions. Through the xeer system (customary law), the advanced clan structure has served governmental roles in many rural Somali communities.

Somali society is traditionally ethnically endogamous. So to extend ties of alliance, marriage is often to another ethnic Somali from a different clan. Thus, for example, a recent study observed that in 89 marriages contracted by men of the Dhulbahante clan, 55 (62%) were with women of Dhulbahante sub-clans other than those of their husbands; 30 (33.7%) were with women of surrounding clans of other clan families (Isaaq, 28; Gadabuursi, 3); and 3 (4.3%) were with women of other clans of the Darod clan family (Marehan 2, Ogaden 1).

Clan structure

Certain clans are traditionally classed as noble clans, referring to their nomadic lifestyle in contrast to the sedentary Sab who are either agropastoralists or artisanal castes. The four noble clans are the  Hawiye, Dir, Darod and Isaaq. Of these, the Dir and Hawiye are regarded as descended from Irir Samaale, the likely source of the ethnonym Somali (soomaali). The Isaaq and Darod have separate agnatic (paternal) traditions of descent through Ishaak ibn Ahmed Al Hashimi (Sheikh Ishak) and Abdirahman bin Isma'il al-Jabarti (Sheikh Darod) respectively. Both Sheikh Ishak and Sheikh Darod are asserted to have married women from the Dir clan, thus establishing matrilateral ties with the Samaale main stem.  "Sab" is the term used to refer to minor Somali clans in contrast to "Samaale". Both Samaale and Sab are the children of their father "Hiil" who is the common ancestor of all Somali clans.

A few clans in the southern part of Greater Somalia do not belong to the major clans, but came to be associated with them and were eventually adopted into one of their confederations: Gaalje'el in Hiran and elsewhere in central Somalia traces its paternal descent to Gardheere Samaale; Garre in the Somali Region and North Eastern Province is divided into two branches: Tuuf claiming itself to be Garre Gardheere Samaale, and Quranyow, who married Tuuf's daughter, is of Mahamed Hiniftir Mahe Dir lineage; Degoodi in the Somali Region and North Eastern Province is related to Gaaje'el as Saransoor and traces its patrilineage to Gardheere Samaale; Hawaadle in Hiran belongs to the Meyle Samaale; Ajuraan in the North Eastern Province claim descent from Maqaarre Samaale and Sheekhaal acknowledges descent from Sheikh Abadir Umar Ar-Rida, also known as Fiqi Umar. Thus, the Gaalje'el, Garre, Degoodi Ajuraan and Hawaadle are said to have patrilateral ties with the Dir and Hawiye through Samaale to Aqil ibn Abi Talib (a cousin of the prophet Muhammad and brother of Ali), whereas the Sheekhaal traces descent to a different forefather than the Samaale progeny, but ultimately also to Aqil ibn Abi Talib. The Sheekhaal (var. Sheikhaal (Arabic: شيخال), also known as Fiqi Omar, is a Somali clan. A Group members of hawiye major clan (Martiile Hiraab) inhabit Somalia, Ethiopia Djibouti and with considerable numbers also found in the Northern Frontier District (NFD) in Kenya.

The Digil and Mirifle (Rahanweyn) are agro-pastoral clans in the area between the Jubba and Shebelle rivers. Many do not follow a nomadic lifestyle, live further south, and speak Maay. Although in the past frequently classified as a Somali dialect, more recent research by the linguist Mohamed Diriye Abdullahi suggests that Maay constitutes a separate but closely related Afro-Asiatic language of the Cushitic branch.

A third group, the occupational clans, are treated as outcasts. They can only marry among themselves.They live in their own settlements among the nomadic populations in the north and performed specialised occupations such as metalworking, tanning and hunting. These minority Somali clans are the Gaboye, Tumaal, Yibir, Jaji and Yahar.

Clans and sub-clans

There is no clear agreement on the clan and sub-clan structures. The divisions and subdivisions as given here are partial and simplified. Many lineages are omitted.

Major clans

 Dir (Aji Irir son of Samaale),
Quranyow-Garre, Surre, Barsug, Madigan, l
Isaaq 
 Arap, Ayuub, Garhajis, Habar Awal, Habar Jeclo, Tol Jecle, Sanbuur and ‘Ibraan
 Darod
 Awrtable, Dhulbahante, Dishiishe, Jidwaq, Leelkase, Majeerteen, Marehan, Mora'ase, Ogaden, Moorsaante {Warsangali}, Geri Koombe

 Hawiye (Irir son of Samaale)
Abgal, Mudulood clan (s), Gugundhabe, Xawaadle, Sheekhaal loobage, Baadi Cade, Jajeele, Geel-Jecel, Duduble, Habar Gidir (s), Murusade, Gorgate
 Digil
 Digil (Non-Mirifle)
 Dabarre, Iroole, Jiido, Garre, Tunni, Geledi, Shanta Aleemo
 Mirifle
Sagaal: Geeladle, Jilible, Gasaargude, Gawaweeyn, Luwaay, Hadame, Yantaar, Hubeer
Siyeed: Elaay. Leysaan, Eemid, Diisow, Yalaale, Qoomaal, Maalin Wiing, Harin, Jiron, Reer Dumaal, Garwaale and Haraw
 Saransor
 Isse, Masare, Gaaljecel, Degodia
 Mayle
Hawadle

Gardheere samaali
 Cowrmale known as coormale ibraahim

Minor clans
 Ashraaf, Aw Xasan Bravanese,  Benadiri, Eyle, Carab Salaax, Gaboye (Madhiban), Muse clan (s), Tumaal, Yibir

Other ethnic groups
Non-Somali ethnic minority groups make up about 15% of the nation's population. They include Cowrmale Bantus, Bajunis, Ethiopians, Indians, Pakistanis, Persians, Arabs, Italians, Swedes, and Britons.

Languages

Somali and Arabic are the official languages of Somalis. The Somali language is the mother tongue of the Somalis, the nation's most populous ethnic group. It is a member of the Cushitic branch of the Afroasiatic family.

In addition to Somali, Arabic, which is also an Afroasiatic tongue, is an official national language in Somalia. Many Somalis speak it due to centuries-old ties with the Arab world, the far-reaching influence of the Arabic media, and religious education.

English is widely used and taught. Italian used to be a major language, but its influence significantly diminished following independence. It is now most frequently heard among older generations, government officials, and in educated circles. Other minority languages include Bravanese, a variant of the Bantu Swahili language that is spoken along the coast by the Bravanese people, as well as Bajuni, another Swahili dialect that is the mother tongue of the Bajuni ethnic minority group.

Population

The proportion of children below the age of 15 in 2010 was 44.9%, 52.3% was between 15 and 65 years of age, while 2.7% was 65 years or older.

Vital statistics

Registration of vital events in Somalia is incomplete. The Population Department of the United Nations prepared the following estimates:

Demographic statistics

Demographic statistics according to the World Population Review.

One birth every 46 seconds	
One death every 3 minutes	
One net migrant every 16 minutes	
Net gain of one person every 1 minutes

The following demographic are from the CIA World Factbook unless otherwise indicated.

Population
12,386,248 (2022 est.)
11,259,029 (July 2018 est.)
10,428,043 (2014 est.)

Religions
Sunni Muslim (Islam) (official, according to the 2012 Transitional Federal Charter)

Age structure

0-14 years: 42.38% (male 2,488,604/female 2,493,527)
15-24 years: 19.81% (male 1,167,807/female 1,161,040)
25-54 years: 30.93% (male 1,881,094/female 1,755,166)
55-64 years: 4.61% (male 278,132/female 264,325)
65 years and over: 2.27% (2020 est.) (male 106,187/female 161,242)

0-14 years: 42.87% (male 2,410,215 /female 2,416,629)
15-24 years: 19.35% (male 1,097,358 /female 1,081,762)
25-54 years: 31.23% (male 1,821,823 /female 1,694,873)
55-64 years: 4.35% (male 245,744 /female 243,893)
65 years and over: 2.19% (male 95,845 /female 150,887) (2018 est.)

Birth rate
37.98 births/1,000 population (2022 est.) Country comparison to the world: 8th
39.3 births/1,000 population (2018 est.) Country comparison to the world: 9th
40.87 births/1,000 population (2014 est.)

Death rate
11.62 deaths/1,000 population (2022 est.) Country comparison to the world: 17th
12.8 deaths/1,000 population (2018 est.)
13.91 deaths/1,000 population (2014 est.)

Total fertility rate
5.31 children born/woman (2022 est.) Country comparison to the world: 9th
5.7 children born/woman (2018 est.) Country comparison to the world: 6th

Population growth rate
2.42% (2022 est.) Country comparison to the world: 27th
2.08% (2018 est.) Country comparison to the world: 45th
1.75% (2014 est.)

Median age
total: 18.5 years. Country comparison to the world: 210th
male: 18.7 years
female: 18.3 years (2020 est.)

Total: 18.2 years. Country comparison to the world: 211th
Male: 18.4 years 
Female: 18 years (2018 est.)

Net migration rate
-2.18 migrant(s)/1,000 population (2022 est.) Country comparison to the world: 171st
-5.6 migrants/1,000 population (2018 est.) Country comparison to the world: 199th
-9.51 migrants/1,000 population (2014 est.)

Contraceptive prevalence rate
6.9% (2018/19)

Dependency ratios
Total dependency ratio: 97.4 (2015 est.)
Youth dependency ratio: 92.1 (2015 est.)
Elderly dependency ratio: 5.3 (2015 est.)
Potential support ratio: 18.8 (2015 est.)

Urbanization

urban population: 47.3% of total population (2022)
rate of urbanization: 4.2% annual rate of change (2020-25 est.)

Urban population: 45% of total population (2018)
Rate of urbanization: 4.23% annual rate of change (2015-20 est.)

Urban population: 37.7% of total population (2011)
Rate of urbanization: 3.79 annual rate of change (2010-15 est.)

Sex ratio
At birth: 1.03 males/female 
Under 15 years: 1 male/female 
15–64 years: 1.07 males/female 
65 years and over: 0.66 males/female 
Total population: 1.01 males/female (2015 est. )

Infant mortality rate
Total: 93 deaths/1,000 live births 
Male: 101.4 deaths/1,000 live births 
Female: 84.3 deaths/1,000 live births (2018 est.)

Life expectancy at birth
total population: 55.72 years. Country comparison to the world: 225th
male: 53.39 years
female: 58.12 years (2022 est.)

Total population: 53.2 years 
Male: 51 years 
Female: 55.4 years (2018 est.)

Total population: 51.58 years
Male: 49.58 years
Female: 53.65 years (2014 est.)

Major infectious diseases
degree of risk: very high (2020)
food or waterborne diseases: bacterial and protozoal diarrhea, hepatitis A and E, and typhoid fever
vectorborne diseases: dengue fever, malaria, and Rift Valley fever
water contact diseases: schistosomiasis
animal contact diseases: rabies

note: on 21 March 2022, the US Centers for Disease Control and Prevention (CDC) issued a Travel Alert for polio in Africa; Somalia is currently considered a high risk to travelers for circulating vaccine-derived polioviruses (cVDPV); vaccine-derived poliovirus (VDPV) is a strain of the weakened poliovirus that was initially included in oral polio vaccine (OPV) and that has changed over time and behaves more like the wild or naturally occurring virus; this means it can be spread more easily to people who are unvaccinated against polio and who come in contact with the stool or respiratory secretions, such as from a sneeze, of an “infected” person who received oral polio vaccine; the CDC recommends that before any international travel, anyone unvaccinated, incompletely vaccinated, or with an unknown polio vaccination status should complete the routine polio vaccine series; before travel to any high-risk destination, CDC recommends that adults who previously completed the full, routine polio vaccine series receive a single, lifetime booster dose of polio vaccine

HIV/AIDS
HIV/AIDS - adult prevalence rate
0.1% (2017 est.)
HIV/AIDS - people living with HIV/AIDS
11,000 (2017 est.)
HIV/AIDS - deaths
<1000 (2017 est.)

Major infectious diseases
Degree of risk: high 
Food or waterborne diseases: bacterial and protozoal diarrhea, hepatitis A and E, and typhoid fever 
Vector-borne diseases: dengue fever, malaria, and Rift Valley fever 
Water contact disease: schistosomiasis 
Animal contact disease: rabies (2013)

Nationality
Noun: Somali (singular) or Somali (plural)
Adjective: Somali

Ethnic groups
Somali 85%
Bantu and other non-Somali 15%.

Languages
Somali (official)
Arabic
English

Literacy
Definition: age 15 and over can read and write 
Total population: N/A

See also

 Somalia
Child marriage in Somalia
 Demographics of Djibouti
 Demographics of Eritrea
 Demographics of Ethiopia

Notes

References
 Conflict in Somalia: Drivers and Dynamics, Worldbank, January 2005, Appendix 2, Lineage Charts
 Victims and Vulnerable Groups in Southern Somalia, Country Information and Policy Unit, Home Office, Great Britain, Somalia Assessment 2001
 Somali Clan Structure, Country Information and Policy Unit, Home Office, Great Britain, Somalia Assessment 2001

External links

"The Somali Ethnic Group and Clan System", from "Reunification of the Somali People", Jack L. Davies